
Year 1519 (MDXIX) was a common year starting on Saturday (link will display the full calendar) of the Julian calendar, the 1519th year of the Common Era (CE) and Anno Domini (AD) designations, the 519th year of the 2nd millennium, the 19th year of the 16th century, and the 10th and last year of the 1510s decade.

Events 
 January–June 
 January 1 – Ulrich Zwingli preaches for the first time, as people's priest of the Great Minister in Zürich.
 March 4 – Hernán Cortés and his conquistadores land in Mexico.
 April 21 (Maundy Thursday) – Hernán Cortés reaches San Juan de Ulúa; next day (Good Friday) he sets foot on the beach of modern-day Veracruz.
 May 2 – 67-year-old Leonardo da Vinci dies.
 June 28 – Charles I of Spain becomes Charles V, Holy Roman Emperor (rules until 1556).

 July–December 
 July 4 – Martin Luther joins the debate regarding papal authority, against Johann Eck at Leipzig.
 July 10 – The Prince of Ning rebellion begins, after Zhu Chenhao declares the Ming dynasty's Zhengde Emperor a usurper, and leads his army north in an attempt to capture Nanjing. 
 August 15 – Panama City is founded.
 August 20 – Ming Dynasty Chinese philosopher and general Wang Yangming, governor of Jiangxi, defeats Zhu Chenhao, ending the Prince of Ning rebellion. Wang has expressed the intention of using fo–lang–ji cannons in suppressing the rebellion, probably the earliest reference in China to the breech-loading Frankish culverin.
 September 20 – Ferdinand Magellan departs from Spain with a fleet of five ships, to sail westbound to the Spice Islands.
 October 12 – Hernán Cortés and his men, accompanied by 3,000 Tlaxcalans, enter Cholula.
 November 8 – Hernán Cortés enters Tenochtitlan, and the court of Aztec ruler Moctezuma.

 Date unknown 
 The first civil revolt in Anatolia takes place, led by Alevi preacher Celâl.
 The Spanish invade Barbados.
 Spanish conquistadors sailing up the Pacific coast from Panama first observe modern-day Nicaragua, landing at the Gulf of Nicoya.
 Havana moves from the southern to the northern part of Cuba.
 A large pandemic spreads from the Greater Antilles into Central America, and perhaps as far as Peru in South America. This widespread epidemic kills off much of the indigenous populations in these areas (the first widely documented epidemic in the New World).
 Central Mexico Amerindians' population reaches 25.3 million.
 The Mexican Indian Wars begin.
 Cacao comes to Europe.
 St. Olaf's Church, Tallinn is completed in Estonia.
 The first recorded fatal accident involving a gun in England is recorded at Welton, East Riding of Yorkshire.
 The artistic form appears in Georgia and spreads.

Births 

 January 1 – Gómez Pérez Dasmariñas, Spanish colonial administrator (d. 1593)
 January 18 – Isabella Jagiellon, queen consort of Hungary (d. 1559)
 February 5 – René of Châlon, Prince of the House of Orange (d. 1544)
 February 15 – Pedro Menéndez de Avilés, first Spanish Governor of Florida (d. 1574)
 February 16 – Gaspard de Coligny, French Huguenot leader (d. 1572)
 February 17 – Francis, Duke of Guise, French soldier and politician (d. 1563)
 February 19 – Froben Christoph of Zimmern, author of the Zimmern Chronicle (d. 1566)
 March 4 
 Hindal Mirza, Mughal Emperor (d. 1551)
 Adrian Stokes, English politician (d. 1586)
 March 17 – Thoinot Arbeau, French priest and author (d. 1595)
 March 22 – Catherine Brandon, Duchess of Suffolk, English noblewoman (d. 1580)
 March 31 – King Henry II of France (d. 1559)
 April 13 – Catherine de' Medici, Italian noblewoman, queen consort of Henry II of France and regent of France (d. 1589)
 May 27 – Girolamo Mei, Italian humanist historian (d. 1594)
 June 6 – Andrea Cesalpino, Italian philosopher, physician, and botanist (d. 1603)
 June 12 – Cosimo I de' Medici, Grand Duke of Tuscany (d. 1574)
 June 15 – Henry FitzRoy, 1st Duke of Richmond and Somerset, illegitimate son of King Henry VIII of England (d. 1536)
 June 23 – Johannes Goropius Becanus, Dutch physician, linguist and humanist (d. 1572)
 June 24 – Theodore Beza, French theologian (d. 1605)
 July 20 – Pope Innocent IX (d. 1591)
 September 23 – Francis, Count of Enghien, French military leader (d. 1546)
 October 14 – Marie of Brandenburg-Kulmbach, Princess of Brandenburg-Kulmbach and by marriage Electress Palatine (d. 1567)
 November 9 – Ogasawara Nagatoki, Japanese daimyō (d. 1583)
 November 22 – Johannes Crato von Krafftheim, German humanist and physician (d. 1585)
 date unknown
 Janet Beaton, Scottish noblewoman (d. 1569)
 Nicholas Grimald, English poet (d. 1562)
 Edwin Sandys, English archbishop (d. 1588)
 Barbara Thenn, Austrian merchant and Münzmeister  (d. 1579)
 Imagawa Yoshimoto, Japanese warlord (d. 1560)
 Paula Vicente, Portuguese artist, musician and writer (d. 1576)
 Stanisław Zamoyski, Polish nobleman (d. 1572)
 probable
 Thomas Gresham, English merchant and financier (d. 1579)
 Edmund Grindal, Archbishop of Canterbury (d. 1583)
possible
 Catherine Howard, fifth Queen of Henry VIII of England (born between 1518 and 1524; d. 1542)

Deaths 

 January 12
 Maximilian I, Holy Roman Emperor (b. 1459)
 Vasco Núñez de Balboa, Spanish explorer (b. 1475)
February 6 – Lorenz von Bibra, Prince-Bishop of the Bishopric of Würzburg (b. 1459)
 March 29 – Francesco II Gonzaga, Marquess of Mantua (b. 1466)
 April 15 – Henry, Count of Württemberg-Montbéliard (1473–1482) (b. 1448)
 April 18 – Sibylle of Bavaria, Electress Palatine consort (b. 1489)
 May 2 – Leonardo da Vinci, Italian inventor and artist (b. 1452)
 May 4 – Lorenzo de' Medici, Duke of Urbino (b. 1492)
 May 13 – Artus Gouffier, Lord of Boissy, French nobleman and politician (b. 1475)
 June 2 – Philippe de Luxembourg, French Catholic cardinal (b. 1445)
 June 24 – Lucrezia Borgia, Duchess of Ferrara (b. 1480)
 July 13 – Zhu Youyuan, Ming dynasty politician (b. 1476)
 July 27 – Zanobi Acciaioli, librarian of the Vatican (b. 1461)
 August 11 – Johann Tetzel, German opponent of the Reformation (b. 1465)
 August 23 – Philibert Berthelier, Swiss patriot (b. c. 1465)
 September – John Colet, English churchman and educator (b. 1467)
 date unknown
 William Grocyn, English scholar (b. 1446)
 Ambrosius Holbein, German painter (b. 1494)

References